Bowesville is an under construction station on the Trillium Line in Ottawa, Ontario. It is being constructed as part of the Stage 2 O-Train expansion and is scheduled for completion in 2023. The station will consist of two side platforms and is located southeast of the intersection of Bowesville and Earl Armstrong roads.

References

Trillium Line stations
Railway stations scheduled to open in 2023